Cedar Mountains may refer to:
 Cedar Mountains (Nevada)
 Cedar Mountains (Iron County), a mountain range of Utah
 Cedar Mountains (Tooele County, Utah)
 Cedar Mountain Wilderness

See also
 Cedar Mountain Range, mountain range in New Mexico
 Cedar Mountain (disambiguation)